Butyl PBD or b-PBD (short for butyl-phenyl-bipheny-oxydiazole) is a fluorescent organic compound used in the Liquid Scintillator Neutrino Detector (LSND) at Los Alamos National Laboratory, USA.

The fluorescent emission of b-PBD is at λem = 364 nm for excitation at λex = 305 nm (in ethanol solution). As a scintillant in the LSND, it was used at a concentration of 31 mg/L (87 μmol/L) dissolved in mineral oil.

References

Oxadiazoles
Tert-butyl compounds